Euplagia splendidior is a moth of the family Erebidae. It was described by Tams in 1922. It is found in Armenia, Nakhichevan, eastern Turkey and northern Iraq (the Zagros Mountains).

References

Callimorphina
Moths described in 1922
Insects of Turkey